Noel Cox (April 5, 1911 - October 2, 1985) was an American politician from Spokane, Missouri, who served in the Missouri Senate and the Missouri House of Representatives.

References

1911 births
1985 deaths
Republican Party members of the Missouri House of Representatives
Republican Party Missouri state senators
20th-century American politicians